Bags is the plural of bag.

Bags or The Bags may also refer to:

Nickname
 Jeff Bagwell (born 1968), American retired Major League Baseball player
 Milt Jackson (1923–1999), American jazz vibraphonist

Music
 Bags (Los Angeles band), a punk rock band formed in the 1970s
 The Bags (Massachusetts band), a hard rock band formed in the 1980s
 The Bags (album), released in 2008
 "Bags" (song), a song by Clairo

Other uses
 Periorbital puffiness, swelling around the eyes
 "Bags", the first episode of the seventh season of Weeds
 Target Toss Pro: Bags, an arcade video game
 Cornhole, a game commonly referred to as bags
 Oxford bags, a form of baggy trousers originating from the University of Oxford

Lists of people by nickname